Visnaren is a lake of Södermanland, Sweden. It is about 50 km west of the capital Stockholm, in the east of the country.

Lakes of Södermanland County